Adam Oliver may refer to:
 Adam Oliver (politician)
 Adam Oliver (footballer)